Acraga leberna is a moth in the family Dalceridae. It was described by Druce in 1890. It is found in Panama, Colombia, Venezuela, Guyana, Suriname, French Guiana, Ecuador, northern Brazil (Amazon Basin), Peru and Bolivia.

The length of the forewings is 11–15 mm for males and 16–19 mm for females. Adults are on wing year-round.

References

Moths described in 1890
Dalceridae